Lucius Burckhardt (March 12, 1925 in Davos – August 26, 2003 in Basel) was a Swiss sociologist and economist. He was an important thinker in Architectural theory and Design theory and the founder of strollology.

Publications 
Lucius Burckhardt Writings. Rethinking Man-made Environments (Hrsg. Jesko Fezer / Martin Schmitz), Springer (Ambra), Wien/New York, 2012.

External links 
www.lucius-burckhardt.org biography, texts
personal page of Lucius Burckhardts on the server of the university of Kassel, Germany
 
 books by Lucius Burckhardt at Martin Schmitz publishers

1925 births
2003 deaths
Swiss sociologists
Swiss economists